Panchaia (also Panchaea   Greek) is an island, first mentioned by ancient Greek philosopher Euhemerus in the late 4th century BC. Euhemerus describes this place as home to a utopian society made up of a number of different ethnic tribes having a collective economy and his trip there in his major work Sacred History, only fragments of which survive.

Fragments preserved by followers such as the later Greek historian Diodorus Siculus and 4th century AD Christian writer Eusebius of Caesarea describe Panchaia as a rational island paradise located in the Indian Ocean. Euhemerus went there by traveling through the Red Sea and around the Arabian Peninsula; in the island's temple of Zeus Triphylius he discovered a register of the births and deaths of the gods, proving they were merely historical figures. The island is also mentioned by Lygdamus (Tib. 3.2.23), one of the Tibullan elegists, as a rich place from which he will hope for gifts to his grave. Virgil called the Island "incense bearing, rich with sands" ("totaque turiferis Panchaia pinguis harenis" Georgics 2.139).

Several islands may be probable locations, including Socotra or Bahrain.

References

Bibliography 

Locations in Greek mythology
Mythological islands